Harold Nash, Jr. (born May 5, 1970 in New Orleans, Louisiana) is a current American football strength and conditioning coach of the National Football League (NFL). He is also a former defensive back in the Canadian Football League.

Playing career
Nash attended St. Augustine High School in New Orleans, Louisiana where he played defensive back. He then attended the University of Southwestern Louisiana, where he went from a walk-on defensive back in 1988 to being voted a permanent team captain by 1992. After spending training camp with the NFL's New York Giants in 1993, Nash moved to the CFL. He first joined the expansion Shreveport Pirates (1994–1995) who folded at the conclusion of the 1995 season.  Nash later joined the Montreal Alouettes (1996–1999), but midway through the 1999 season, joined the Winnipeg Blue Bombers (1999–2003) with whom he set a team record for all-time pass knockdowns.  He played his final CFL season with the Edmonton Eskimos. In total, Nash recorded 367 tackles and 24 interceptions throughout his CFL career. He was also named a CFL All-Star three times.

Coaching career
After retiring from the CFL after their 2004 season, Nash joined the Patriots as an assistant strength and conditioning coach for their 2005 season. He was promoted to head strength and conditioning coach for the 2011 season. He won his first Super Bowl title when the Patriots defeated the Seattle Seahawks in Super Bowl XLIX.

On January 29, 2016, Nash was hired as the head strength and conditioning coach for the Detroit Lions.
On January 3, 2020, Nash was fired by head coach Matt Patricia.

Personal life
Nash has a son.

References

External links
Dallas Cowboys bio

1970 births
Living people
St. Augustine High School (New Orleans) alumni
American players of Canadian football
American strength and conditioning coaches
American football defensive backs
Canadian football defensive backs
Detroit Lions coaches
Edmonton Elks players
Louisiana Ragin' Cajuns football players
Montreal Alouettes players
New England Patriots coaches
Shreveport Pirates players
Players of American football from New Orleans
Players of Canadian football from New Orleans
Sportspeople from New Orleans
Winnipeg Blue Bombers players